Michael Strain may refer to:

 Michael R. Strain, American economist
 Michael G. Strain (born 1958), Louisiana Agriculture and Forestry Commissioner